The Billabong Creek, a perennial river of the Murrumbidgee catchment within the Murray–Darling basin, is located in the South West Slopes region of New South Wales, Australia.

Course and features
Formed by the confluence of the Ironbong and Turveys Falls Creeks, Billabong Creek rises west of Bethungra, northeast of the village of Illabo, and flows generally south southeast, then south by west, before reaching its confluence with the Murrumbidgee River, east of Wantabadgery, west of Gundagai. The river descends  over its  course.

See also 

 Rivers of New South Wales
 List of rivers of New South Wales (A–K)
 List of rivers of Australia

References

External links
 

Rivers of New South Wales
Tributaries of the Murrumbidgee River